The Oxford Presbyterian Church is a historic Presbyterian church located at Oxford, Indiana, USA. Its congregation originated as an offshoot of Central Presbyterian Church of Lafayette, Indiana. At the time of its establishment, there were two separate churches, First and Second Presabyterian Churches of Lafayette. In 1914, they merged as Central Presbyterian.  The church was built in 1902 and is a 1½-story, Romanesque Revival style brick building with a gable / hipped roof. It features a three-story, square corner tower with a pyramidal roof.

It was listed on the National Register of Historic Places as Presbyterian Church Building in 1984.

The former church has been preserved as a community center and local history museum known as Oak Grove Heritage House.

References

Citations

Sources
History of Churches & Worship Groups in the Oxford Area by Iris Gray Dowling, 2012

External links
 Oak Grove Heritage House - official site

Churches on the National Register of Historic Places in Indiana
Romanesque Revival architecture in Indiana
Churches completed in 1902
20th-century Presbyterian church buildings in the United States
National Register of Historic Places in Benton County, Indiana
Churches in Benton County, Indiana
Museums in Benton County, Indiana
1902 establishments in Indiana